Denis Avril (born 31 October 1972 in Thouars) is a French international professional rugby union player.

As a prop, Avril played for Biarritz Olympique with which he won three Top 14 titles. In 2008 he left Biarritz to play for Aviron Bayonnais. He earned his only cap with France on 2 July 2005 against Australia in Brisbane.

External links 
 ESPN player profile
ercrugby

French rugby union players
France international rugby union players
1972 births
Living people
Sportspeople from Deux-Sèvres
Rugby union props